Cerrina Monferrato (population about 1,600) is a commune in the Province of Alessandria in the Italian region Piedmont, located about  east of Turin and about  northwest of Alessandria. The commune borders Gabiano to the north, Mombello Monferrato to the east, Castelletto Merli and Odalengo Piccolo to the south, and Odalengo Grande and Villamiroglio to the west. The two principal population centres are Valle Cerrina which had a population of 583 at the time of the 2001 census, and Cerrina itself, the historic centre and capoluogo which had a population of 353. Montalero (pop. 35) and Rosingo (pop. 261) were both communes in their own right until 1928. The other settlements include Montaldo, Piancerreto and Gaminella: although the last lies mostly within the commune of Mombello Monferrato.

History

References

Cities and towns in Piedmont